Ostorhinchus cookii, common names Cook's cardinalfish, Cook's soldierfish, blackbanded cardinal, blackbanded cardinalfish, is a species of marine fish in the family Apogonidae.

This species grows to a maximum length of 10 cm. It is a reef fish that is also used in the aquarium industry. Its distribution extends from the Red Sea and the Gulf of Oman south to KwaZulu Natal eastwards into the western Pacific from Japan to the Great Barrier Reef and New Caledonia. It has recently been reported to occur in Tonga and from Persian Gulf. It lives solitarily or in small groups.

Macleay did not specify who the specific name honours but it is almost certainly Captain James Cook (1728-1779) the British explorer, navigator and cartographer. Cook named the type locality, the Endeavour River in Queensland after his ship, HMS Endeavour, after beaching there for repairs in 1770.

References

cookii
Fish of the Indian Ocean
Fish described in 1881